Power of Seven may refer to:
 Power of Seven (album), an album by System 7
 Power of Seven (publisher), a digital music content publisher
 Power of Seven (Goals), the annihilation of Manchester United by Liverpool on 5 March 2023